This article contains the discography of American R&B singer Perri "Pebbles" Reid. This includes studio albums, compilation albums, and singles.

Albums

Studio albums

 Album credited to Sister Perri.

Compilation albums
Greatest Hits (2000, Hip-O)

Singles

As main performer

 Single credited to Sister Perri.

As featured performer

Music videos

References

External links

Discographies of American artists
Rhythm and blues discographies
Electronic music discographies
Pop music discographies